Guy Brunton  (1878 in London, England – 17 October 1948 in White River, Mpumalanga, South Africa) was an English archaeologist and Egyptologist who discovered the Badarian predynastic culture. He married Winifred Newberry on 28 April 1906. Her father built Prynnsberg Estate. He served in the First World War and returned to archaeology becoming assistant director of the Cairo Museum in 1931, he retired to South  Africa.

A student of Sir Flinders Petrie, Brunton became Assistant Director of the Egyptian Museum in Cairo in 1931.

References

Publications

1878 births
1948 deaths
British archaeologists
English Egyptologists
British expatriates in South Africa
20th-century archaeologists
20th-century English writers
20th-century English male writers
Egyptian Museum
Alumni of University College London
Artists' Rifles soldiers
Badarian culture
British expatriates in Egypt